The 1985 Cork Senior Football Championship was the 97th staging of the Cork Senior Football Championship since its establishment by the Cork County Board in 1887. The draw for the opening round fixtures took place on 27 January 1985. The championship began on 13 April 1985 and ended on 15 September 1985.

Imokilly entered the championship as the defending champions, however, they were defeated by Avondhu in the first game of the championship.

On 15 September 1985, St. Finbarr's won the championship following a 1-10 to 0-09 defeat of Clonakilty in the final. This was their 8th championship title overall and their first title since 1982.

Dave Barry from the St. Finbarr's club was the championship's top scorer with 1-27.

Team changes

To Championship

Promoted from the Cork Intermediate Football Championship
 Midleton

Results

First round

Second round

Quarter-finals

Semi-finals

Final

Championship statistics

Top scorers

Top scorers overall

Top scorers in a single game

References

Cork Senior Football Championship
1985 in Gaelic football